Rice Lake, Minnesota may refer to:

 Rice Lake, Minnesota, a city in Saint Louis County
 Rice Lake (CDP), Minnesota, a census-designated place in Clearwater County
 Rice Lake (ghost town), Minnesota, a former village in Dodge and Steele counties
 Rice Lake, Wright County, Minnesota, an unincorporated community